William Alex Foxen (born February 1, 1991) is an American poker player from Huntington, New York.

Foxen attended Boston College, where he played tight end on the school's football team. In 2012, at the age of 21, he won the first World Series of Poker circuit event he entered in New Orleans. He however declared that he didn't start playing poker seriously until the age of 23, when he graduated from university.

At this time, he played online for a couple of years before making a transition to live poker in 2016, starting with small tournaments of $200 to $500 buy-ins.

Foxen's first WSOP final table came in 2017. In December of that year, he finished second in the Five Diamond World Poker Classic on the World Poker Tour, earning more than $1,134,000.

In 2018, Foxen earned more than $6.6 million and won high roller events on the WPT and Asia Pacific Poker Tour, as well as finishing runner-up in the Party Poker Millions event in Nottingham, England for $947,000 and the Super High Roller Bowl for $2,160,000, his largest career cash. He earned Player of the Year honors from Global Poker Index and was ranked No. 1 for 38 consecutive weeks from October 2018 to June 2019, a GPI record. At the 2019 WSOP, he finished 40th in the Main Event.

Foxen made the final table of the Five Diamond World Poker Classic for the second time in three years in December 2019. He won the tournament, defeating Toby Joyce heads-up and earning nearly $1.7 million for his first WPT title. The win moved him atop the GPI's POY race for the second straight year.

Foxen won his maiden bracelet at the 2022 WSOP, winning $4,563,700 in the 250K super high roller.

In April 2022, Foxen accused pro Ali Imsirovic of cheating at both live and online poker events.
In August 2022, he was defeated in the tournament by Hnat from Ukraine.

Personal life 
Alex Foxen is engaged to fellow professional poker player Kristen Bicknell. In June 2018, he defeated her heads-up to win the Mid-Stakes Poker Tour Venetian event. During the 2021 WSOP, Foxen stirred up controversy by questioning the COVID vaccine requirements of the Rio casino.

References

External links
WSOP.com profile
Hendon Mob profile
Global Poker Index profile

1991 births
American poker players
World Poker Tour winners
Boston College Eagles football players
People from Cold Spring Harbor, New York
People from Huntington, New York
Living people